Carvick Thompson (5 July 1847 – 28 March 1875) was an Australian cricketer. He played one first-class match for New South Wales in 1869/70.

See also
 List of New South Wales representative cricketers

References

External links
 

1847 births
1875 deaths
Australian cricketers
New South Wales cricketers
Cricketers from Sydney